The 2015–16 Morehead State Eagles men's basketball team represented Morehead State University during the 2015–16 NCAA Division I men's basketball season. The Eagles, led by fourth year head coach Sean Woods, played their home games at Ellis Johnson Arena and were members of the East Division of the Ohio Valley Conference. They finished the season 23–14, 11–5 in OVC play to finish in a three-way tie for second place in the East Division. They defeated Morehead State in the quarterfinals of the OVC tournament to advance to the semifinals where they lost to UT Martin. They were invited to the College Basketball Invitational where they defeated Siena, Duquesne, and Ohio to advance to the best-of-three finals series against Nevada where they lost 2 games to 1.

Roster

Schedule

|-
!colspan=9 style="background:#000099; color:#FFD51D;"| Exhibition

|-
!colspan=9 style="background:#000099; color:#FFD51D;"| Regular season

|-
!colspan=9 style="background:#000099; color:#FFD51D;"|Ohio Valley tournament

|-
!colspan=9 style="background:#000099; color:#FFD51D;"| CBI

References

Morehead State Eagles men's basketball seasons
Morehead State
Morehead State